This is a list of Spanish-language authors, organized by country.

Argentina
Roberto Arlt (1900–1942)
Adolfo Bioy Casares (1914–1999)
Jorge Luis Borges (1899–1986)
Sergio Chejfec (born 1956)
Julio Cortázar (1914–1984)
Esteban Echeverría (1805–1851)
Juana Manuela Gorriti (1818–1892)
José Hernández (1834–1886)
Sylvia Iparraguirre (born 1947)
Leopoldo Lugones (1874–1938)
Manuel Mujica Láinez (1910–1984)
Ricardo Piglia (1941–2017)
Manuel Puig (1932–1990)
Ernesto Sabato (1911–2011)
Domingo Faustino Sarmiento (1811–1888)
Ana Maria Shua (born 1951)
Alfonsina Storni (1892–1938)
Patricio Sturlese (born 1973)
Héctor Tizón (1929–2012)
Luisa Valenzuela (born 1938)

Bolivia 
 Marcelo Quiroga Santa Cruz (1931–1980)

Chile
Isabel Allende (born 1942)
Eduardo Anguita (1914–1992)
Roberto Bolaño (1953–2003)
José Baroja (born 1983)
María Luisa Bombal (1910–1980)
José Donoso (1924–1996)
Ariel Dorfman (born 1942)
Jorge Edwards (born 1931)
Diamela Eltit (born 1949)
Alberto Fuguet (born 1964)
Gustavo Gac-Artigas (born 1944)
Olga Grau (born 1945)
Vicente Huidobro (1893–1948)
Enrique Lihn (1929–1988)
Sergio Missana (born 1968)
Gabriela Mistral (1889–1957)
Pablo Neruda (1904–1973)
Gonzalo Rojas (1916–2011)
Manuel Rojas  (1896–1973)
Antonio Skármeta (born 1940)
Luis Sepúlveda (1949–2020)
Marcela Serrano (born 1951)

Colombia
Andrés Caicedo (1951–1977)
Gabriel García Márquez (1927–2014)
Jorge Isaacs (1837–1895)
Álvaro Mutis (1923–2013)
Rafael Pombo (1833–1912)
José Eustasio Rivera (1888–1928)
Fernando Soto Aparicio (1933–2016)
Fernando Vallejo (born 1942)
Samael Aun Weor (1917–1977)
Héctor Abad Faciolince (born 1958)
Gustavo Álvarez Gardeazábal (born 1945)
Gonzalo Arango Arias (1931–1976)
Porfirio Barba-Jacob (1883–1942)
Tomás Carrasquilla (1858–1940)
Germán Castro Caycedo (1940–2021)
Manuel Mejía Vallejo (1923–1998)
Jairo Aníbal Niño (1941–2010)
Laura Restrepo (born 1950)
Olga Elena Mattei (born 1933)
José Eustasio Rivera (1888–1928)
Daniel Samper Pizano (born 1945)
José Asunción Silva (1865–1896)
José María Vargas Vila (1860–1933)
Albalucía Angel (born 1939)
Magdalena León de Leal (born 1939)
Fanny Buitrago (born 1943)
Jorge Franco (born 1962)

Costa Rica
Manuel Argüello Mora (1834–1902)
Alfonso Chase (born 1945)
Fabián Dobles (1918–1997)
Quince Duncan (born 1940)
Carlos Luis Fallas (1909–1966)
Carlos Gagini (1865–1925)
Joaquín García Monge (1881–1958)
Manuel González Zeledón ("Magón") (1864–1936)
Max Jiménez (1900–1947)
Tatiana Lobo (born 1939)
Carmen Lyra (1888–1949)
José Marín Cañas (1904–1981)
Carmen Naranjo (1928–2012)
Julieta Pinto (1921–2022)
Emilia Prieto Tugores (1902–1986)
José León Sánchez (born 1929)
Rodrigo Soto (born 1962)

Cuba
Brígida Agüero y Agüero (1837–1866)
Reinaldo Arenas (1943–1990)
Miguel Barnet (born 1940)
Guillermo Cabrera Infante (1929–2005)
Alejo Carpentier (1904–1980)
Daína Chaviano (born 1957)
Enrique Cirules (1938–2016)
Domitila García Doménico de Coronado (1847–1938)
Gertrudis Gómez de Avellaneda (1814–1873)
Nicolás Guillén (1902–1989)
José Lezama Lima (1910–1976)
Dulce María Loynaz (1902–1997)
José Martí (1853–1895)
Leonardo Padura Fuentes (born 1955)
Gonzalo de Quesada (1496/1506 or 1509–1579)
Ernesto Juan Castellanos (born 1963)
Severo Sarduy (1937–1993)
Zoé Valdés (born 1959)

Dominican Republic
Fabio Fiallo (1866–1942)
Pedro Henríquez Ureña (1884–1946)
Juan Bosch (1909–2001)
Joaquín Balaguer (1909–2002)
Pedro Mir (1913–2000)
Alfredo Fernández Simó (1915–1991)
Junot Díaz (born 1970)

Ecuador
 Abdón Ubidia, (born 1944), novelist
 Adalberto Ortiz (1914–2003), novelist, poet and diplomat
 Agustin Cueva (1937–1992), literary critic and sociologist
 Alejandro Carrión Aguirre (1915–1992), poet, novelist and journalist
 Alfonso Rumazo González (1903–2002), historian, essayist and literary critic
 Alfredo Gangotena – poet who wrote in French and Spanish
 Alfredo Pareja Diezcanseco (1908–1993), novelist, essayist, journalist, historian
 Alicia Yánez Cossío (born 1928), poet, novelist and journalist
 Ángel Felicísimo Rojas (1909–2003), novelist, and poet
 Arturo Borja (1892–1912), poet
 Aurelio Espinosa Pólit (1894–1961), poet, translator 
 Benjamín Carrión Mora (1897–1979), writer
 Benjamín Urrutia (born 1950), author and scholar
 Carlos Altamirano Sánchez – poet and journalist
 Carlos Eduardo Jaramillo Castillo – poet
 Carmen Acevedo Vega – poet and writer
 Dolores Veintimilla (1829–1857), poet
 Edmundo Ribadeneira Meneses (1920–2004), writer and university professor
 Eduardo Varas – novelist and journalist
 Efraín Jara Idrovo – poet and writer
 Enrique Gil Gilbert (1912–1973), novelist, journalist, poet
 Ernesto Noboa y Caamaño – poet
 Eugenio Espejo (1747–1795), writer and lawyer
 Euler Granda (1935–2018), poet, novelist
 Fanny Carrión de Fierro – poet, essayist and professor
 Filoteo Samaniego – novelist, poet, historian, translator, and diplomat
 Francisco Tobar Garcia – poet, novelist, and playwright
 Gabriel Cevallos García – writer and historian
 Galo René Pérez – biographer, poet, and essayist
 Horacio Hidrovo Peñaherrera – poet and writer
 Horacio Hidrovo Velásquez – poet, novelist and short story writer
 Hugo Mayo (1895–1988), poet
 Humberto Fierro – poet
 Isacovici Salomon (1924–1998), writer
 Iván Carvajal (born 1948), poet, philosopher, writer
 Jaime Galarza Zavala – poet, journalist and politician
 Jenny Estrada – Writer and journalist
 Joaquín Gallegos Lara – novelist and short story writer
 Jorge Carrera Andrade – poet
 Jorge Icaza Coronel (1906–1978), novelist
 Jorge Luis Cáceres (born 1982), editor, anthologist
 Jorge Núñez Sánchez (1947–2020), writer, historian and professor
 Jorge Pérez Concha (1908–1995), historian, biographer, writer and diplomat
 José de la Cuadra – novelist and short story writer
 José Joaquín de Olmedo – poet
 José Martínez Queirolo – playwright
 Fray José María Vargas O.P. (1902–1988), writer and historian
 José Rumazo González – poet
 Juan Bautista Aguirre y Carbo (1725–1786), poet 
 Juan Larrea Holguín (1927–2006), writer and lawyer
 Juan León Mera (1832–1894), essayist, novelist, politician
 Juan Manuel Rodríguez (born 1945), professor and author
 Juan Montalvo (1832–1889), author and essayist
 Julio Pazos Barrera (born 1944), poet
 Karina Galvez (born 1964), poet
 Luis Alberto Costales – poet, philosopher, writer, professor and politician
 Luis Enrique Fierro (born 1936), poet and medical doctor
 Medardo Ángel Silva – poet
 Miguel Donoso Pareja – poet, novelist, and short-story writer
 Nela Martínez (1912–2004), activist, and writer
 Nelson Estupiñán Bass (1912–2002), poet
 Nicolás Kingman Riofrío – journalist, writer and politician
 Numa Pompilio Llona (1832–1907), poet, journalist, educator, diplomat, and philosopher
 Octavio Cordero Palacios – playwright, poet, mathematician, lawyer, professor and inventor
 Pedro Jorge Vera (1914–1999), writer and politician
 Rafael Díaz Ycaza – poet, novelist, and short story writer
 Raquel Verdesoto – poet, biographer, teacher, feminist activist
 Raúl Andrade Moscoso (1905–1983), journalist and playwright
 Rodolfo Pérez Pimentel (born 1939), biographer
 Sonia Manzano Vela (born 1947), writer and pianist
 Ulises Estrella (1939–2014), poet, film expert
 Víctor Manuel Rendón (1859–1940), poet, novelist, playwright, biographer, translator

Ecuatorial Guinea
 María Nsué Angüe (1945–2017 )
 Juan Balboa Boneke (1938–2014)
 Juan Tomás Ávila Laurel (born 1966)
 Donato Ndongo-Bidyogo (born 1950)
 Raquel Ilombé (¿1938?–1992)
 Justo Bolekia Boleká
 Leoncio Evita Enoy (1929–1996)

El Salvador
Claribel Alegría (1924–2018)
Arturo Ambrogi (1874–1936)
Manlio Argueta (born 1935)
Mario Bencastro (born 1949)
Horacio Castellanos Moya (born 1957)
Carlos Castro (born 1944)
José Roberto Cea
Roque Dalton (1935–1975)
Jacinta Escudos
Alfredo Espino (1900–1928)
Francisco Gavidia (1863–1955)
Pedro Geoffroy Rivas (1908–1979)
Claudia Hernández González
David J. Guzmán
Claudia Lars (1899–1974)
Francisco Machón Vilanova
Alberto Masferrer
Salarrué (1899–1975)

Guatemala
Arturo Arias
Miguel Ángel Asturias (1899–1974)
Flavio Herrera (1895–1968)
Mario Monteforte Toledo (1911–2003)
Augusto Monterroso (1921–2003)
Máximo Soto Hall (1871–1944)

Honduras
 Ramón Amaya Amador (1916–1966)
 Roberto Sosa (1930–2011) 
 Eduardo Bähr (born 1940)

Mexico

Mariano Azuela (1873–1952)
Rosario Castellanos (1925–1974)
Salvador Díaz Mirón (1853–1928)
Juana Inés de la Cruz (1648/1651–1695)
Ricardo Elizondo Elizondo (1950–2013)
Laura Esquivel (born 1950)
Carlos Fuentes (1928–2012)
Elena Garro (1894–1971)
Eve Gil (born 1968)
Manuel Gutiérrez Nájera (1859–1895)
Jorge Ibargüengoitia (1928–1983)
Rossy Evelin Lima (born 1986)
Germán List Arzubide (1898–1998)
Ramón López Velarde (1888–1921)
Manuel Maples Arce (1898–1981)
Ángeles Mastretta (born 1949)
Amado Nervo (1870–1919)
Rosa Nissán (born 1939
Salvador Novo (1904–1974)
Fernando del Paso (1935–2018)
Octavio Paz (1914–1998)
Carlos Pellicer (1897–1977)
Sergio Pitol (1933–2018)
Elena Poniatowska (born 1932)
Ricardo Raphael (born 1968)
Alfonso Reyes (1889–1959)
Juan Rulfo (1917–1986)
Alberto Ruy-Sánchez (born 1951)
Jaime Sabines (1926–1999)
Carlos Tello Díaz (born 1962)
Arqueles Vela (1899–1977)
Xavier Villaurrutia (1903–1950)
Gabriel Zaid (born 1934)

Nicaragua
Gioconda Belli (born 1948)
Omar Cabezas (born 1950)
Ernesto Cardenal (1925–2020)
Alfonso Cortés (1893–1969)
Pablo Antonio Cuadra (1912–2002)
Rubén Darío (1867–1916)
Salomón de la Selva (1893–1959)
José Coronel Urtecho (1906–1994)
Sergio Ramírez (born 1942)

Panama
Rosa María Britton (1936–2019)
Gloria Guardia (1940–2019)
Darío Herrera (1870–1914)
Ricardo Miró (1883–1940)
María Olimpia de Obaldía (1891–1985)
Elsie Alvarado de Ricord (1928–2005)
José Luis Rodríguez Pittí (born 1971)

Paraguay
Alcibiades González Delvalle (born 1936)
Augusto Roa Bastos (1917–2005)

Peru
Ciro Alegría
José María Arguedas (1911–1969)
César Atahualpa Rodríguez (1889–1972)
Alfredo Bryce Echenique (born 1939)
Fernando Fernán Gómez (1921–2007)
María Emma Mannarelli (born 1954)
Clorinda Matto de Turner (1853–1909)
Scarlett O'Phelan Godoy (born 1951)
Isabel Sabogal (born 1958)
César Vallejo (1892–1938)
Mario Vargas Llosa (born 1936)
Inca Garcilaso de la Vega (1539–1616)
See the complete list at List of Peruvian writers.

Philippines
Jesús Balmori (1887–1948)
Edmundo Farolán
Adelina Gurrea Monasterio (1896–1971)
Graciano López Jaena (1856–1896)
Apolinario Mabini (1864–1903) 
José Palma (1876–1903)
Marcelo H. del Pilar (1850–1896)
Guillermo Gómez Rivera (born 1936)
Claro M. Recto (1890–1960)
José Rizal (1861–1896)
Antonio Abad (1894–1970)

Puerto Rico
 Julia de Burgos, poet
 Giannina Braschi, author of "El imperio de los suenos," and "Yo-Yo Boing!" 
 Rosario Ferré, author of "Sweet Diamond Dust"
 René Marqués, author of "La Carretera"
 Luis Rafael Sánchez, author of "Macho Camacho's Beat"

Spain
Joan Baptista Aguilar (died 1714)
Rafael Alberti (1902–1999)
Pedro Antonio de Alarcón (1833–1891)
Clarín (1852–1901)
Ignacio Aldecoa (1925–1969)
Josefina Aldecoa (1926–2011)
Vicente Aleixandre (1898–1984)
Mateo Alemán (1547–1614)
Dámaso Alonso (1898–1990)
Núria Añó (born 1973)
Joaquín Arderíus (1885–1969)
Teresa of Ávila (1515–1582)
Arturo Barea (1897–1957)
Pío Baroja (1872–1956)
Carlos Be (born 1974)
Gustavo Adolfo Bécquer (1836–1870)
Gonzalo de Berceo (c. 1190 – c. 1264)
José María Blanco-White (1775–1841)
Vicente Blasco Ibáñez (1867–1928)
Juan Boscán (1490–1542)
José Cadalso (1741–1782)
Pedro Calderón de la Barca (1600–1681)
Gabriela Bustelo (born 1962)
Francisco Fernández Carvajal (born 1938)
Rosalía de Castro (1837–1885)
Camilo José Cela (1916–2002)
Luis Cernuda (1902–1963)
Miguel de Cervantes (1547–1616)
Gutierre de Cetina  (1520–1557)
Álvaro Cunqueiro (1911–1981)
San Juan de la Cruz (1542–1591)
Miguel Delibes (1920–2010)
Agustín Díaz Pacheco (born 1953)
Gerardo Diego (1896–1987)
Juan del Encina (1469–1533)
Vicente Espinel (1550–1624)
José de Espronceda (1808–1842)
Fray Benito Jerónimo Feijoo (1676–1764)
León Felipe (1884–1968)
Gloria Fuertes (1917–1998)
Espido Freire (born 1974)
Federico García Lorca (1898–1936)
Juan García Rodenas (born 1976)
José María Gironella (1917–2003)
Luis de Góngora (1561–1627)
José Goytisolo (1928–1999)
Juan Goytisolo (1931–2017)
Luis Goytisolo (born 1935)
Baltasar Gracián (1601–1658)
Fray Antonio de Guevara (1480–1545)
Jorge Guillén (1893–1984)
Miguel Hernández (1910–1942)
José Hierro (1922–2002)
Francisco Javier Illán Vivas (born 1958)
Tomás de Iriarte (1750–1791)
Juan Ramón Jiménez (1881–1958)
Gaspar de Bracamonte (c. 1595 – 1676)
Gaspar Melchor de Jovellanos (1744–1811)
Mariano José de Larra (1809–1837)
Fray Luis de León (1527 – c. 1591)
Fernando S. Llobera (born 1965)
Íñigo López de Mendoza, marqués de Santillana (1398–1458)
Mariló López Garrido (born 1963)
Antonio Machado (1875–1936)
Manuel Machado (1874–1947)
Jorge Manrique (1440–1479)
Javier Marías (born 1951)
Julián Marías (1914–2005)
Juan Marsé (1933–2020)
Carmen Martín Gaite (1925–2000)
Luis Martín-Santos (1924–1964)
Azorín (1863–1967)
Ana María Matute (1925–2014)
Eduardo Mendoza Garriga (born 1943)
Marcelino Menéndez Pelayo (1856–1912)
Gabriel Miró (1879–1930)
Agustín Moreto y Cavana (1618–1661)
Antonio Muñoz Molina (born 1956)
Marysa Navarro (born 1934)
Emilia Pardo Bazán (1851–1921)
Benito Pérez Galdós (1843–1920)
Arturo Pérez-Reverte (born 1951)
Francisco de Quevedo (1580–1680)
Vicente Risco (1884–1963)
Fernando de Rojas (1465–1541)
Francisco de Rojas Zorrilla (1607–1660)
Luis Rosales (1910–1992)
Juan Ruiz, Archpriest of Hita (c. 1283 – c. 1350)
Juan Ruiz de Alarcón (1581–1639)
Carlos Ruiz Zafón (1964–2020)
Pedro Salinas (1892–1951)
José Luis Sampedro (1917–2013)
Marta Segarra (born 1963)
Tirso de Molina (1571–1648)
Gonzalo Torrente Ballester (1910–1999)
Miguel de Unamuno (1864–1936)
Juan Valera (1824–1905)
Ramón del Valle-Inclán (1866–1936)
Félix Lope de Vega (1562–1635)
Garcilaso de la Vega (1503–1536)
Esteban Manuel de Villegas (1589–1669)
María de Zayas y Sotomayor (1590–1661)
José Zorrilla y Moral (1817–1893)
Alfonso Vallejo (1943–2021)
Carlos G. Vallés (1925–2020)
Agustín García Calvo (1926–2012)
Lydia Zimmermann

United States
Fray Angelico Chavez (1910–1996) 
Sandra Cisneros (born 1954)
Giannina Braschi (born 1953)
Julia de Burgos (1914–1953)

Uruguay
Eduardo Acevedo Díaz
José Enrique Rodó
Eduardo Galeano (1940–2015)
Bartolomé Hidalgo
Jorge Majfud (born 1969)
Mario Benedetti (1920–2009)
Orosmán Moratorio
Juan Carlos Onetti (1909–1994)
Horacio Quiroga (1878–1937)
Carlos Vaz Ferreira
Idea Vilariño (1920–2009)

Venezuela
Rómulo Gallegos (1884–1969)
Arturo Uslar Pietri (1906–2001)

See also
List of Spanish-language poets

Lists of writers by language
Spanish-language literature